The 1938 New England Hurricane (also referred to as the Great New England Hurricane and the Long Island Express Hurricane) was one of the deadliest and most destructive tropical cyclones to strike Long Island, New York, and New England. The storm formed near the coast of Africa on September 9, becoming a Category 5 hurricane on the Saffir–Simpson hurricane scale, before making landfall as a Category 3 hurricane on Long Island on Wednesday, September 21. It is estimated that the hurricane killed 682 people, damaged or destroyed more than 57,000 homes, and caused property losses estimated at $306 million ($4.7 billion in 2017). Multiple other sources, however, mention that the 1938 hurricane might have really been a more powerful Category 4, having winds similar to Hurricanes Hugo, Harvey, Frederic and Gracie when it ran through Long Island and New England. Also, numerous others estimate the real damage between  $347 million and almost $410 million. Damaged trees and buildings were still seen in the affected areas as late as 1951. It remains the most powerful and deadliest hurricane in recorded New England history, perhaps eclipsed in landfall intensity only by the Great Colonial Hurricane of 1635.

At the time, roughly half of the 1938 New England hurricane's existence went unnoticed. The Atlantic hurricane reanalysis in 2012 concluded that the storm developed into a tropical depression on September 9 off the coast of West Africa, but the United States Weather Bureau was unaware that a tropical cyclone existed until September 16; by then, it was already a well-developed hurricane and had tracked westward toward the Sargasso Sea. It reached hurricane strength on September 15 and continued to strengthen to a peak intensity of  near The Bahamas four days later, making it a Category 5-equivalent hurricane. The storm was propelled northward, rapidly paralleling the East Coast before making landfalls on Long Island and Connecticut as a Category 3-equivalent hurricane on September 21. After moving inland, it transitioned into an extratropical cyclone and dissipated over Ontario on September 23.

Meteorological history

The Atlantic hurricane reanalysis project analyzed the 1938 Atlantic hurricane season in 2012, and Weather Bureau forecaster Ivan Ray Tannehill noted that the knowledge of the storm's existence at the time remained tenuous until September 17 when the cyclone had already increased to a hurricane. Based on land and marine observations, the reanalysis project concluded that the 1938 hurricane began as a tropical depression just off the coast of West Africa at 12:00 UTC (8 a.m. Eastern Standard Time) on September 9, becoming the sixth tropical cyclone of the season. The depression gradually strengthened, becoming a tropical storm less than a day after tropical cyclogenesis. It was inferred to have reached hurricane intensity over the central Atlantic by September 15, though ship observations became increasingly sparse as the cyclone tracked farther away from land. The first definitive indication of a tropical cyclone at sea was a report from the Brazilian ship SS Alegrete which documented a barometric pressure of 958 mbar (hPa; 28.29 inHg) within hurricane-force winds on September 17.

The hurricane continued to slowly strengthen and track westward at around  about the southern periphery of a subtropical ridge centered over the Sargasso Sea. On September 18, a strong extratropical cyclone developed just west of Chicago, generating a strong influx of cooler air from Canada into the eastern United States and thus forming a sharp cold front over the region; this frontal boundary resulted in a channel of moist, tropical air being steered northwards into New England. At 18:00 UTC (2 p.m. EST) on September 19, the tropical cyclone strengthened further into a Category 5-equivalent hurricane with sustained winds of  while north of the Turks and Caicos; this figure remained unchanged in reanalysis and serves as the storm's peak strength, although the reanalysis project noted that "considerable uncertainty" remains regarding the magnitude of the storm's maximum intensity at sea. Concurrently, the hurricane began to interact with the cold front over the East Coast, causing the tropical cyclone to curve northward towards the northeastern United States; the presence of the subtropical ridge to the east and the stationary nature of the frontal boundary prevented the storm from continuing to curve out to sea.

As the hurricane accelerated northward, it gradually weakened. At 12:00 UTC (8 a.m. At 19:45 UTC (3:45 p.m. Weather Bureau forecaster Charles Pierce argued that the hurricane became extratropical off of the Outer Banks, though Charles J. Neumann, Frances P. Ho, and the Atlantic hurricane reanalysis project suggested that it was tropical but in the process of extratropical transition at landfall. The storm steadily weakened, becoming fully extratropical over Vermont by 00:00 UTC on September 22 (September 21, 8 p.m. EST). Following this transition, the remnants continued to weaken before they dissipated over southeastern Ontario on September 23.

Forecasting the storm
In 1938, United States forecasting lagged behind forecasting in Europe, where new techniques were being used to analyze air masses, taking into account the influence of fronts. A confidential report was released by the United States Forest Service, the parent agency of the United States Weather Bureau. It described the weather bureau's forecasting as "a sorry state of affairs" where forecasters had poor training and systematic planning was not used, and where forecasters had to "scrape by" to get information wherever they could. The Jacksonville, Florida, office of the weather bureau issued a warning on September 19 that a hurricane might hit Florida. Residents and authorities made extensive preparations, as they had endured the Labor Day Hurricane three years earlier. When the storm turned north, the office issued warnings for the Carolina coast and transferred authority to the bureau's headquarters in Washington.

At 9:00 am EDT on September 21, the Washington office issued northeast storm warnings north of Atlantic City and south of Block Island, Rhode Island, and southeast storm warnings from Block Island to Eastport, Maine. The advisory, however, underestimated the storm's intensity and said that it was farther south than it actually was. The office had yet to forward any information about the hurricane to the New York City office. At 10:00 am EDT, the bureau downgraded the hurricane to a tropical storm. The 11:30 am advisory mentioned gale-force winds but nothing about a tropical storm or hurricane.

That day, 28 year-old rookie Charles Pierce was standing in for two veteran meteorologists. He concluded that the storm would be squeezed between a high-pressure area located to the west and a high-pressure area to the east, and that it would be forced to ride up a trough of low pressure into New England. A noon meeting was called and Pierce presented his conclusion, but he was overruled by "celebrated" chief forecaster Charles Mitchell and his senior staff. In Boston, meteorologist E.B. Rideout told his WEEI radio listeners – to the skepticism of his peers – that the hurricane would hit New England. At 2:00 pm, hurricane-force gusts were occurring on Long Island's South Shore and near hurricane-force gusts on the coast of Connecticut. Re-analysis of the storm suggests that the hurricane was farther north and just  from Fire Island, and that it was stronger and larger than the advisory stated.

Impact

The majority of the storm damage was from storm surge and wind. Damage was estimated at $308 million, the equivalent of $5.1 billion adjusted for inflation in 2016 dollars, making it among the most costly hurricanes to strike the U.S. mainland. It is estimated that, if an identical hurricane had struck in 2005, it would have caused $39.2 billion in damage due to changes in population and infrastructure.

Approximately 600 people died in the storm in New England, most in Rhode Island, and up to 100 people elsewhere in the path of the storm. An additional 708 people were reported injured.

In total, 4,500 cottages, farms, and other homes were reported destroyed and 25,000 homes were damaged. Other damages included 26,000 automobiles destroyed and 20,000 electrical poles toppled. The hurricane also devastated the forests of the Northeast, knocking down an estimated two billion trees in New York and New England.

Over 35% of New England's total forest area was affected. In all, over 2.7 billion board feet of trees fell because of the storm, although 1.6 billion board feet of the trees were salvaged. The Northeastern Timber Salvage Administration (NETSA) was established to deal with the extreme fire hazard that the fallen timber had created.  In many locations, roads from the fallen tree removal were visible decades later, and some became trails still used today. The New York, New Haven and Hartford Railroad from New Haven to Providence was particularly hard hit, as countless bridges along the Shore Line were destroyed or flooded, severing rail connections to badly affected towns such as Westerly, Rhode Island.

Due to the lack of technology in 1938, Long Island residents were not warned of the hurricane's arrival, leaving no time to prepare or evacuate. Long Island was struck first, before New England and Quebec, earning the storm the nickname the "Long Island Express."

Yale and Harvard both owned large forests managed by their forestry departments, but both forests were wiped out by the hurricane. However, Yale had a backup forest at Great Mountain in northwestern Connecticut which was spared from the totality of the damages, and they were able to keep their forestry program running, which maintains operation today. Harvard's program, however, was reduced as a result.

New Jersey
The western side of the hurricane caused sustained tropical storm-force winds, high waves, and storm surge along the Jersey Shore and destroyed much of the boardwalk in Atlantic City. The Brigantine Bridge was destroyed over Absecon Inlet between Atlantic City and Brigantine, New Jersey. The surge inundated several coastal communities; Wildwood was under  of water at the height of the storm, and the boardwalk was destroyed in Bay Head and dozens of cottages washed into the ocean. Crops sustained wind damage.

New York City and western Long Island
The metropolitan area escaped the worst of the wind and storm surge because it was hit by the storm's weaker western side. The highest winds were from the north to northwest on the back side of the storm. In New York Harbor, the waters rose  in a half-hour.

In New York City and Long Island, schools were dismissed early. Extensive street flooding occurred because debris blocked drains. The East River flowed three blocks and flooded a Consolidated Edison (Con Ed) plant at 133rd Street, causing power to fail in Manhattan north of 59th Street and in the Bronx for several minutes to a few hours. Railroad and ferry services were suspended for a time. The Staten Island Ferry boat Knickerbocker got stuck in the terminal with 200 passengers aboard.  Bridges and tunnels into Manhattan were closed until the following afternoon. 95% of Nassau County lost power, where floods brought traffic to a halt.

In Manhasset Bay, almost 400 boats were ripped from their moorings and smashed or sunk, with more than 100 washing up on the beach by the Port Washington Yacht Club. Similar scenes occurred in other locations on the north shore. The J. P. Morgan estate in Glen Cove was heavily damaged. The wife of New York City mayor Fiorello La Guardia was forced to wait out the storm on the second floor of their Northport cottage. In Williston Park, residents of 50 homes needed to be rescued by rowboat when heavy rain the previous few days combined with the rain from the hurricane to overflow a pond.

Eastern Long Island
Eastern Long Island experienced the worst of the storm. The Dune Road area of Westhampton Beach was obliterated, resulting in 29 deaths. There were 21 other deaths through the rest of the east end of Long Island. The storm surge temporarily turned Montauk into an island as it flooded across the South Fork at Napeague and obliterated the tracks of the Long Island Rail Road.

Long Island was hit hard being exposed to the storm due to its shorelines. About 50 people perished in the storm's wake. All the shore lines were very vulnerable to the high winds and flooding, and anyone near the shores was directly in harm's way.

Ten new inlets were created on eastern Long Island. The surge rearranged the sand at the Cedar Point Lighthouse so that the island became connected to what is now Cedar Point County Park. The surging water created the Shinnecock Inlet by carving out a large section of barrier island separating Shinnecock Bay from the Atlantic. The storm toppled the landmark steeple of the Old Whaler's Church, which was the tallest building in Sag Harbor. The steeple has not been rebuilt.

Wading River suffered substantial damage. The storm blew down the movie theater on Front Street in Greenport on the North Fork of Long Island. The fishing industry was destroyed, as was half of the apple crop.

Rhode Island

Block Island was comparatively unaffected by waves, with two fishermen killed, one by drowning, but it was greatly affected by wind, with most barns and farm outbuildings destroyed. The storm surge hit Westerly, Rhode Island at 3:50 pm, resulting in 100 deaths. The tide was higher than usual because of the autumnal equinox and full moon, and the hurricane produced storm tides of 14 to  along most of the Connecticut coast, with 18 to  tides from New London, Connecticut east to  Cape Cod—including the entire coastline of Rhode Island.

The storm surge was especially violent along the Rhode Island shore, sweeping hundreds of summer cottages out to sea. Several motorists were drowned in their automobiles. In Jamestown, seven children were killed when their school bus was blown into Mackerel Cove. Mobs looted stores in downtown Providence, often before the flood waters had fully subsided and due in part to the economic difficulties of the Great Depression.

Many homes and structures were destroyed along the coast, as well as many structures inland along the hurricane's path, and entire beach communities were obliterated on the coast. Napatree Point was completely swept away, a small cape that housed nearly 40 families between the Atlantic Ocean and Little Narragansett Bay just off of Watch Hill. Napatree is now a wildlife refuge with no human inhabitants. Concrete staircases and boardwalk bases destroyed by the hurricane can still be found when sand levels are low on some beaches. The boardwalk along Easton's Beach in Newport was completely destroyed by the storm.

A few miles from Conanicut Island, Whale Rock Light was swept off its base and into the waves, killing lighthouse keeper Walter Eberle. His body was never found. The Prudence Island Light suffered a direct blow from the storm surge, which measured  at Sandy Point. The masonry tower was slightly damaged, but the adjoining light keeper's home was utterly destroyed and washed out to sea. The light keeper's wife and son were both killed, as well as the former light keeper and a couple who left their summer cottages near the lighthouse and sought shelter in what they thought was the sturdier light keeper's home. Light keeper George T. Gustavus was thrown free from the wreckage of the house and was saved by an island resident who held a branch into the water from the cliffs farther down the coast. Gustavus and Milton Chase, the owner of the island's power plant, reactivated the light during the storm by running a cable from the plant to the light and installing a light bulb, marking the first time that it was illuminated with electricity.

The original parchment of the 1764 Charter of Brown University was washed clean of its text when its vault was flooded in a Providence bank. A study of sand deposits also gives evidence that this was the strongest hurricane to hit Rhode Island in over 300 years. The Fox Point Hurricane Barrier was completed in 1966 because of the massive flooding from the 1938 storm, and from the even higher  storm surge that resulted from 1954's Hurricane Carol, in hopes of preventing extreme storm surges from ever again flooding downtown Providence.

Connecticut

Eastern Connecticut was on the eastern side of the hurricane. Long Island acted as a buffer against large ocean surges, but the waters of Long Island Sound rose to great heights. Small shoreline towns to the east of New Haven experienced much destruction from the water and winds, and the 1938 hurricane holds the record for the worst natural disaster in Connecticut's 350-year history.

In the shoreline towns of Madison, Clinton, Westbrook, and Old Saybrook, buildings were found as wreckage across coastal roads. Actress Katharine Hepburn waded to safety from her Old Saybrook beach home, narrowly escaping death. She stated in her 1991 book that 95% of her personal belongings were either lost or destroyed, including her first Oscar for her appearance in Morning Glory (1933 film), which was later found intact. In Old Lyme, beach cottages were flattened or swept away. The NYNH&H passenger train Bostonian became stuck in debris at Stonington. Two passengers drowned while attempting to escape before the crew was able to clear the debris and get the train moving. Rescuers found live fish and crabs in kitchen drawers and cabinets while searching for survivors in the homes in Mystic.

New London was first swept by the winds and storm surge, after which the waterfront business district caught fire and burned out of control for 10 hours. Stately homes along Ocean Beach were leveled by the storm surge. Interior sections of the state experienced widespread flooding as the hurricane's torrential rains fell on soil already saturated from previous storms. The Connecticut River was forced out of its banks, inundating cities and towns from Hartford to Middletown.

Ultimately the storm became the deadliest and costliest storm in Connecticut history.

Massachusetts

The eye of the storm followed the Connecticut River north into Massachusetts, where the winds and flooding killed 99 people. Flash flooding on the Chicopee River washed away the Chicopee Falls Bridge, while the Connecticut River flooded most of the Willimansett section. Residents of Ware were stranded for days and relied on air-dropped food and medicine. After the flood receded, the town's Main Street was a chasm in which sewer pipes could be seen.

To the east, the surge left Falmouth and New Bedford under eight feet of water. Two-thirds of the boats sank in New Bedford harbor. Several homes were washed away on Atlantic Boulevard in Fall River, and their foundations can still be found on the beach today. A  wave, the tallest of the storm, was recorded at Gloucester.

Vermont
The storm entered Vermont as a Category 1 hurricane at approximately 6:00 pm EDT, reaching northern Vermont, Burlington, and Lake Champlain around 8:00 pm. Hurricane-force winds caused extensive damage to trees, buildings, and power lines. Over  of public roads were blocked, and it took months for crews to reopen some of the roads. In Montpelier,  from the nearest coast, salt spray was seen on windows. A train was derailed in Castleton. The storm killed five people in Vermont. Maple and sugar groves were damaged. It is the only system on record to have entered the state as a tropical cyclone.

New Hampshire

Even though the storm center tracked further west, through Vermont, New Hampshire received considerable damage. As in Vermont, very high winds brought down numerous trees and electric lines, but rainfall totals in New Hampshire were significantly less than those in other states. Only  of rain fell in Concord. Damage at Peterborough was worse, however; total damage there was stated to be $500,000 (1938 dollars, $6.5 million in 2005), which included the destruction of 10 bridges. Much of the lower downtown burned because floodwaters prevented firefighters from reaching and extinguishing the blaze. Other communities also suffered considerable damage to forest resources. In New Hampshire, 13 people perished.

Maine
In Maine, buildings and trees were damaged and power outages occurred. Storm surge was minimal, and winds remained below hurricane strength. The storm did not claim any lives in Maine.

Maryland and Delaware
The western periphery of the hurricane brought heavy rain and gusty winds to Delaware and southeastern Maryland.  Damage, if any, is believed to have been minimal.

Quebec
As the hurricane was transitioning into an extratropical cyclone, it tracked into southern Quebec. By the time the system initially crossed into Canada, it continued to produce heavy rain and very strong winds, but interaction with land had caused the system to weaken significantly. Still, many trees were blown down.  Otherwise, damage in this region was minimal.

See also

 Hurricane Irene – A major hurricane that passed through New England in 2011, following its landfall
 Hurricane Sandy – A powerful storm that caused significant damage in the Northeastern United States in 2012, mostly as an extratropical cyclone
 List of Atlantic hurricanes
 List of Category 5 Atlantic hurricanes
 List of Delaware hurricanes
 List of New England hurricanes
 List of wettest tropical cyclones in Massachusetts

Explanatory notes

Citations

Bibliography

Further reading

External links

 
 
 
 

 
New England Hurricane
New England Hurricane
New England Hurricane
New England Hurricane
Cape Verde hurricanes
Category 5 Atlantic hurricanes
Hurricanes in Connecticut
Hurricanes in Delaware
Hurricanes in Maine
Hurricanes in Massachusetts
Hurricanes in New England
Hurricanes in New Hampshire
Hurricanes in New York (state)
Hurricanes in Rhode Island
Hurricanes in Vermont
Long Island
Hurricane 1938
Hurricane 1938
Hurricane 1938
Hurricane 1938
New England Hurricane